The Wahkonsa Hotel, also known as Wahkonsa Manor, is a historic building located in Fort Dodge, Iowa, United States.  It was built by the city's Commercial Club to provide a first-class hotel for the community.  The five story, brick, Renaissance Revival-style structure was designed by the prominent Des Moines architectural firm of Liebbe, Nourse & Rasmussen.  The building served as a hotel until 1972 when it was converted into apartments for low-income people.  It retained the first-floor commercial space, which was original to the building.  It was individually listed on the National Register of Historic Places in 2008, and as a contributing property in the Fort Dodge Downtown Historic District in 2010.

References

Hotel buildings completed in 1910
Renaissance Revival architecture in Iowa
Hotel buildings on the National Register of Historic Places in Iowa
Buildings and structures in Webster County, Iowa
Fort Dodge, Iowa
National Register of Historic Places in Webster County, Iowa
Individually listed contributing properties to historic districts on the National Register in Iowa